In mathematics, endoscopic groups of reductive algebraic groups were introduced by  in his work on the stable trace formula.

Roughly speaking, an endoscopic group H of G is a quasi-split group whose L-group is the connected component of the centralizer of a semisimple element of the L-group of G.

In the stable trace formula,  unstable orbital integrals on a  group G correspond to  stable orbital integrals on its endoscopic groups H. The relation between them is given by the fundamental lemma.

References

Automorphic forms
Langlands program